The House at 20 Morrison Road in Wakefield, Massachusetts is a well-preserved Colonial Revival house.  The -story wood-frame house originally had a semicircular portico, a relative rarity in Wakefield.  The porch has turned balusters, and the three roof dormers have pedimented gable ends.  The house was built about 1890 on land originally part of the large estate of Dr. Charles Jordan, that was developed in the 1880s as Wakefield Park.

The house was listed on the National Register of Historic Places in 1989.

See also
National Register of Historic Places listings in Wakefield, Massachusetts
National Register of Historic Places listings in Middlesex County, Massachusetts

References

Houses on the National Register of Historic Places in Wakefield, Massachusetts
Colonial Revival architecture in Massachusetts
Houses completed in 1890
Houses in Wakefield, Massachusetts